Kongor Rural District is a rural district (dehestan) in the Central District of Kalaleh County, Golestan Province, Iran. At the 2006 census, its population was 21,115, in 4,807 families.  The rural district has 42 villages.

References 

Rural Districts of Golestan Province
Kalaleh County